The 1968 UMass Redmen football team represented the University of Massachusetts Amherst in the 1968 NCAA College Division football season as a member of the Yankee Conference. The team was coached by Vic Fusia and played its home games at Alumni Stadium in Hadley, Massachusetts. UMass finished the season with a record of 2–8 overall and 2–3 in conference play.

Schedule

References

UMass
UMass Minutemen football seasons
UMass Redmen football